We Are Your Friends is a 2015 drama film directed by Max Joseph (in his feature directorial debut) and with a screenplay by Joseph and Meaghan Oppenheimer, from a story by Richard Silverman. The film stars Zac Efron, Emily Ratajkowski and Wes Bentley, and follows a young Los Angeles DJ trying to make it in the music industry and figure out life with his friends.

The film was released in the United States by Warner Bros. Pictures on August 28, 2015. Its financier, StudioCanal, distributed it internationally, including France, the United Kingdom, Germany, the Netherlands, Australia and New Zealand. The film received mixed reviews and grossed $11 million.

Plot
Cole Carter (Zac Efron), a former track star, college dropout, and struggling 23-year-old DJ in the electronic dance music (EDM) scene, dreams of becoming a major record producer. Cole books a gig to DJ at a local nightclub, where he meets the headliner, a once-innovative DJ, James Reed (Wes Bentley). James invites Cole to a party, where Cole hallucinates because a joint they shared contained Phencyclidine (PCP). The morning after, Cole wakes up at James' house, where he is introduced to Sophie (Emily Ratajkowski), James' girlfriend and personal assistant, who drives him home.

Later, James calls Cole to DJ at his house party, a paid gig. Cole's friends Dustin Mason (Jonny Weston), Ollie (Shiloh Fernandez), and Squirrel (Alex Shaffer) show up, and after a party goer insults Mason, Mason gets in a fight with him and has to be pulled out of James's pool. Despite his background and friends, James sees potential in Cole and takes him as his student. After listening to Cole's original song, James criticizes Cole for imitating other well-known producers, and he suggests using organic sounds for an original vibe. They write a song using the original vibe technique and vocals from Sophie, which is well received at a local nightclub. Next, Cole and his friends head to Las Vegas for a music festival, where he meets up with Sophie, whom James ditched. Sophie gives Cole MDMA, and they sleep together, spending the night at a hotel.

Back in San Fernando, James invites Cole over to watch an MMA fight with him and Sophie. An awkward moment ends up with Sophie telling Cole to accept what happened and leave it alone, and James gives Cole a new MacBook Pro and the opportunity to open for him at a popular music festival. One day, Cole and Paige (Jon Bernthal) meet up with Tanya Romero (Alicia Coppola), whose house is being foreclosed. During the negotiation, Paige buys her house and rents it back to her, intending to sell it quickly for a substantial price, which angers Cole. While James' alcoholism begins to affect Sophie, he and Cole go to a strip club for his birthday. Cole gets sick, and James finds out about Cole's relationship with Sophie, and severs ties with him. Returning to his three friends, it is revealed that Squirrel has been looking for better jobs, and Mason has rented a house for all of them. Following intense partying, Squirrel is found unconscious and dies from an overdose. After the funeral, the remaining friends begin to question their future, and go their separate ways after Mason blames Ollie for the drugs that killed Squirrel. Cole visits James, whose alcoholism has completely consumed him, to let him know of Squirrel's death and that it could possibly have been his fault. James consoles him and also tells him that Sophie moved to the San Fernando Valley and works at a local coffee shop, where he later visits her.

While taking a run, the battery of Cole's phone goes dead, causing his music to stop playing. Upon closer observation, he listens to his surroundings, which inspires him to record samples and integrate them into his long-awaited track. Cole then calls and tells James that he has something for Summer Fest, and James gives him another chance. The festival is set outside the American Apparel building in Los Angeles. Cole releases his track, which contains snippets of his conversations with Sophie and Squirrel, and he later uses Squirrel's quote "Are We Ever Going To Be Better Than This?" as a hook before the beat drop. When the song ends, Cole is met with enthusiastic acclaim from the audience and James. The film concludes with Sophie going back to college, Ollie reading for an audition, Mason handling the nightclub, and Cole remaining positive about his future and creating a proper relationship with Sophie.

In the mid-credits scene, Tanya opens her front door to an Adidas box that Cole has been saving all of his earnings in throughout the film.

Cast

 Zac Efron as Cole Carter
 Emily Ratajkowski as Sophie
 Shiloh Fernandez as Ollie
 Alex Shaffer as Squirrel
 Jonny Weston as Dustin Mason
 Wes Bentley as James Reed
 Joey Rudman as Joey
 Jon Bernthal as Paige Morrell
 Vanessa Lengies as Mel
 Brittany Furlan as Sara
 Jon Abrahams as a club promoter
 Alicia Coppola as Tanya Romero
 Korrina Rico as Crystal
 Nicky Romero as himself (Cameo)
 Dillon Francis as himself
 Alesso as himself
 DallasK as himself
 Them Jeans as himself
 Zach Firtel as DJ Sweet Baby Ray's
 Andy Ward as DJ Xochil
 Hayden Fein as DJ DK
 Jacob Epstein as DJ Bald Dad
 King Bach as himself (Cameo)

Production
On June 6, 2014, Efron entered negotiations to star in an untitled film about a DJ, which was set to be directed by Max Joseph. The film is Joseph's debut. On July 31, 2014, Ratajkowski joined the cast of the film, which by then had been given the title We Are Your Friends, and had a start date of August 18 announced for principal photography. The name came from the 2006 Justice vs. Simian song "We Are Your Friends". Jon Abrahams joined the cast on August 5, Alicia Coppola on August 14, and Wes Bentley on August 18. By that point, Jonny Weston, Shiloh Fernandez, and Alex Shaffer had also signed on to star. In late September, the film cast background actors.

Filming
Principal photography began on August 18, 2014, in the San Fernando Valley. Joseph co-wrote the adapted screenplay with Meaghan Oppenheimer, based on a Richard Silverman story. Working Title Films partners Tim Bevan and Eric Fellner co-produced the film, which was financed by StudioCanal. Silverman was an executive producer. StudioCanal is the worldwide distributor. The promotional tour for the film included stops in London, Paris and 6 North American cities (Toronto, Miami, New York, Chicago, Los Angeles and San Francisco).

Animation
A critically noted scene in the film involves animation depicting Cole's PCP hallucinations at a swanky LA art gallery. Rotoscoping was used to achieve this effect.

Release
In November 2014, Warner Bros. Pictures acquired the film's North American distribution rights. Two weeks later, StudioCanal announced that international distribution had been sold in several markets. On April 28, 2015, Warner Bros. set the film for an August 28, 2015 release. The film was only released on DVD on November 17, 2015, in North America. The Blu-ray was only released in region B (UK, Europe, Oceania, Middle East, Africa) on December 17, 2015.

Reception

Box office
We Are Your Friends grossed $3.6 million in North America and $7.5 million in other territories for a total gross of $11.1 million.

It made $1.8 million in its opening weekend, finishing 14th at the box office. Box Office Mojo reports with a 2,333 theater count, the film grossed an average $758 from each venue, making it the fourth worst debut for a film with a 2,000+ theater average. It was surpassed later in the year by Rock the Kasbah ($731 average) and Jem and the Holograms ($570), both of which opened on October 23, 2015.

Critical response
We Are Your Friends received mixed reviews from critics, although Efron's performance and the soundtrack were praised.

Review aggregator Rotten Tomatoes gave the film an approval rating of 38% based on 133 reviews, with an average rating of 4.93/10. The site's consensus reads, "We Are Your Friends boasts magnetic stars and glimmers of insight, but they're lost in a clichéd coming-of-age story as programmed as the soundtrack's beats." On Metacritic, the film has a score of 46 out of 100, based on 32 critics, indicating "mixed or average reviews". Audiences polled by CinemaScore gave the film a grade of "C+" on an A+ to F scale.

The Hollywood Reporter named Efron's performance as Cole Carter their 2nd-favorite film performance of 2015, behind only Christopher Abbott as the title character of James White. The magazine stated, "And while the picture's box-office returns didn't exactly pump up the volume, this 28-year-old Tyrone Power clone increasingly ranks among the most exciting American actors of his generation." Bilge Ebiri of Vulture.com noted that Ratajkowski's role takes a back seat to the love triangle's central Efron/Bentley relationship.

The movie is the subject of the third season of the podcast The Worst Idea of All Time, in which two New Zealand comedians watch the same movie every week for a whole year, and discuss it each week.

References

External links
 
 

2015 films
2010s musical drama films
British drama films
American independent films
American musical drama films
Films about DJs
Films produced by Eric Fellner
Films produced by Tim Bevan
Films scored by Stewart Copeland
Films set in Los Angeles County, California
Films shot in California
Films with live action and animation
Dune Entertainment films
StudioCanal films
Warner Bros. films
Working Title Films films
2015 directorial debut films
Films set in the San Fernando Valley
2015 drama films
2010s English-language films
2010s American films
2010s British films